Melissa J. Kelly (born December 28, 1962) was appointed in 2001 to represent District 9B, which covers a portion of Baltimore County, Maryland.

Education
Kelly attended Towson State University, where she earned a B.S. degree in biology with honors in 1987.

Career
Kelly was employed as a biology teacher by Towson Catholic High School. In August 2001, her husband James M. Kelly resigned from the Maryland House of Delegates to join the George W. Bush administration. She was appointed to complete his unexpired term, but resigned in January 2002. Emil B. Pielke was then appointed to complete the remainder of her husband's unexpired term.

References

1962 births
Living people
People from Silver Spring, Maryland
Catholics from Maryland
Towson University alumni
Schoolteachers from Maryland
Republican Party members of the Maryland House of Delegates